Catrina may refer to:
Catrina (wrestler), American actress, model and professional wrestler
Catherina (and similar spellings), variant forms of the given name
Catrina River in Romania
La Calavera Catrina, a 1913 zinc etching by Mexican engraver and printmaker José Guadalupe Posada
Catrina M Hampton, owner of Made4u2model, Inc., Fashion Blogger, chief editor of Polyvore.com.

See also

Catriona
Katrina (disambiguation)